Irene Roberts may refer to:

Irene Roberts (Home and Away), fictional character from Home and Away
Irene Roberts (singer) (born 1983), American mezzo-soprano